Zaw Htay (also known as Hmuu Zaw; 1973/1974  23 May 2022) was a Burmese politician, former military officer and spokesman of the Myanmar government. He had served as the director general of the Union Peace Formation under State Counsellor's Office from April 2016 to February 2021. He had previously served as the presidential spokesman of the Myanmar Office of the President from April 2011 to April 2016 under President Thein Sein.

Career
A graduate of the 37th intake of the Defense Services Academy, Zaw Htay served in the Myanmar Army and went on to join the military regime then known as the State Peace and Development Council. He subsequently worked in the office of Prime Minister General Soe Win. After Soe Win died in 2007, Zaw Htay retired from the military with the rank of major and joined the Union Solidarity and Development Association (USDA).

He became the director and spokesman for the Myanmar President Office under Thein Sein. Under the pen name Hmuu Zaw, he became known for his active presence on social media. He used his Facebook account to spar with NLD supporters and occasionally contributed articles to local media outlets, bolstering the reputation of Thein Sein and the Myanmar military. His critics describe him as a strong advocate of former president Thein Sein. In November 2011, writing in The Washington Post, he called on the US and other nations "to help facilitate Myanmar’s connection to the outside world at this critical juncture."

Aung San Suu Kyi picked Zaw Htay to be her spokesman. He was promoted as deputy director general of the president office under Htin Kyaw in April 2016 and appointed director general of the Union Peace Formation under the State Counsellor's Office in 2016.

As a government spokesperson, Zaw Htay spoke the attitudes of the NLD government in regularly held press conferences at Presidential Palace. In the run-up to and after the election, Zaw Htay from the government side and Brigadier General Zaw Min Tun from the Tatmadaw side, who were his weekly counterparts, often expressed their concerns at press conferences. At a press conference in January 2021, Zaw Htay said politicial parties and organizations questioning the result of the recent elections are committing political suicide. That has resulted in military rage hightly. 

After the military coup on 1 February 2021, Zaw Htay was out of sight and detained. He was released in June 2021. A few months after his release, Zaw Htay died of a heart attack at the 1000-bed Nay Pyi Taw Hospital on May 23, 2022 at around 9:00 a.m.

References

1970s births
2022 deaths

Year of birth uncertain

People from Magway Division

Burmese military personnel
Burmese politicians
Defence Services Academy alumni